Giorgos Giakoumakis (born 9 December 1994) is a Greek professional footballer who plays as a striker for Major League Soccer club Atlanta United FC and the Greece national team.

Club career

Early career
Giakoumakis started his career at Atsalenios. In 2012, he signed for Platanias and he debuted for the club in a 3–2 win against Skoda Xanthi, coming in as a substitute in the 78th minute.
In January 2014 he signed for Episkopi on loan until the end of the season and he made a total of 11 appearances and scoring two goals. He returned to Platanias, starting playing more often in the 2014–15 season and on 26 April 2015, he scored his first Superleague goal, in a 2–0 home win Panetolikos.

AEK Athens
On 26 June 2017, Giakoumakis joined AEK Athens on a four-year contract. On 20 December, he scored his first goal with the club in a 4–0 away Greek Cup win against Panetolikos. On 4 February, he scored as a late substitute in stoppage time in 2–1 away win game against champions Olympiacos. It was his first goal in Super League with AEK.

He scored his first goal for the 2018–19 season, in a 2–1 home win against Lamia for the Greek Cup, taking advantage of Lucas Boyé's excellent solo effort.

Loans to OFI and Górnik Zabrze
On 24 January 2019, after a year-and-a-half in AEK Athens, Giakoumakis signed a six months contract with OFI in the club's effort to avoid relegation, with an undisclosed purchase option for the summer of 2019. On 17 March 2019, he scored his first goal with the club in a crucial 2–0 home win over fellow strugglers Levadiakos to climb above their SuperLeague rivals, however both clubs still sit in the relegation zone.

On 3 March 2020, he was loaned out to Ekstraklasa club Górnik Zabrze for the remainder of the current football season. On 30 May 2020, Giakoumakis scored the winning goal for Górnik Zabrze against ŁKS Łódź sealing a vital 1–0 away win for his club. On 23 June 2020, Giakoumakis scored his third goal for Górnik Zabrze in the Ekstraklasa, while teammate Stavros Vasilantonopoulos registered his second marker for the club in the same match. The Greek striker connected with a low pass across the box, neatly turning the ball beyond the goalkeeper into the far right corner, sealing a 3–1 away win against ŁKS Łódź.

VVV-Venlo
On 11 August 2020, Giakoumakis moved to VVV-Venlo. He signed a two-year contract with an option for an additional year with the Dutch club, while AEK Athens received a transfer fee of €600,000. On 12 September, in his first game for VVV, Giakoumakis led his new club to win against FC Emmen by scoring a hat trick in the 2020–21 Eredivisie opener. The Greek forward scored all his goals in the second half, overturning the score, as the hosts were leading up to that point with 2–0. 

On 14 January 2021, Giakoumakis scored all four goals in a 4–1 away victory at ADO Den Haag. Two weeks later, on 28 January 2021, he again scored all four goals in a 4–1 victory: this time at home to Vitesse, and joined former Ajax striker Luis Suárez as the only players in the 21st century to have twice scored four goals in a single Eredivisie game. He was voted Eredivisie Player of the Month for January, having scored the most goals in Netherlands in a calendar month since 1985, and the second-most to Marco Van Basten's 12 with Ajax.

On 14 March, VVV-Venlo may have suffered its seventh consecutive defeat in the Eredivisie, however Giakoumakis with the goal he scored against Fortuna Sittard in an 3–1 home loss, made history as he caught Hans Sleven, who in the 1958–59 season had scored 24 goals in one year, rising to the fifth place of the scorers of all times for the club. On 13 May, Giakoumakis scored in VVV-Venlo's defeat in a crucial match against champions Ajax. After a reasonably good start to the competition, the club was unable to win the last fourteen matches in the league and was relegated while Giakoumakis became top scorer of Eredivisie.

Celtic 
During the summer window, Giakoumakis was wanted by various clubs, with German club Werder Bremen agreeing a transfer fee with Venlo. On 31 August 2021, the last day of the summer transfer window, he signed for Scottish Premiership club Celtic on a five-year contract for a fee of £2.5 million. A month later, he made his debut as a substitute in a 4–0 home loss against Bayer Leverkusen in the UEFA Europa League. On 23 October, Giakoumakis scored his first goal for Celtic, opening the scoring in a 2–0 league win against St Johnstone. On 22 January 2022, Giakoumakis started for the first time in three months and rewarded Ange Postecoglou with a goal in a 2–1 away win over Alloa Athletic in the fourth round of the Scottish Cup.
On 26 January, he scored in a vital 2–1 away win against Heart of Midlothian. 

On 20 February, Giakoumakis scored a hat-trick in a 3–2 win against Dundee. On 14 March, Giakoumakis scored twice to help beat Dundee United and book their place in the semi-finals of the Scottish Cup. On 19 March, he scored his second hat-trick in five games as Celtic beat in-form Ross County 4–0 to move six points clear of Rangers at the top of the table. His efforts in March earned him the SPFL Player of The Month award. On 11 May, Giakoumakis scored in a 1–1 draw at Dundee United which secured the 2021–22 Scottish Premiership title for Celtic. On the final day of the season, Giakoumakis scored a double after coming off the bench against Motherwell to become the joint top goalscorer in the league. This was despite playing in only 21 games, which was 16 fewer than Regan Charles-Cook who also scored 13. His performances that season led to him becoming a popular player amongst the Celtic support, who made a chant in his honour based on German band Nena's single 99 Luftballons.

On 8 October, Giakoumakis scored a dramatic 95th minute winner in a 2-1 victory at St Johnstone; only a few minutes after the home side had equalised via Alex Mitchell. He would go on to make appearances in the UEFA Champions League for Celtic, starting in their opening group stage match against Real Madrid. He scored in a 1–1 draw at home against Shakhtar Donetsk on 25 October. 

In December, media reports emerged claiming that Giakoumakis was unhappy with terms offered to him by Celtic in contract negotiations. He was linked with a move to Saudi Arabia. Giakoumakis later became linked to both Atlanta United FC and Urawa Red Diamonds in January, with multiple reports indicating Atlanta offering a transfer fee of £4.3 million. Celtic confirmed his transfer on 8 February 2023.

Atlanta United 
The Five Stripes have not labeled Giakoumakis as a direct Josef Martínez replacement, but he is nonetheless tasked with No. 9 duties after the club's all-time leading scorer was bought out in mid-January amid a falling out. Martínez, who holds legendary status in Atlanta, joined Inter Miami CF this offseason on a non-DP deal. On 5 March 2023, Giorgos Giakoumakis made his MLS debut, playing in Atlanta's 1-1 draw with Toronto FC.

International career

Greece U21
On 30 March 2015, head coach Kostas Tsanas announced his first call up (replaced Nikolaos Ioannidis) and make his debut with Greece U21 for an international friendly game at Peristeri Stadium against Croatia U21.

Greece
On 11 November 2020, Giakoumakis scored on his debut for the Greece national team against Cyprus in a 2–1 victory. On 12 June 2022, Giakoumakis scored again for Greece against Kosovo in the UEFA Nations League.

Personal life
Giakoumakis was born in Heraklion, Crete, is of Romani origins, and comes from a family that has produced footballers in three generations.

Career statistics

Club

International

Scores and results list Greece's goal tally first, score column indicates score after each Giakoumakis goal

Honours 
AEK Athens
 Super League Greece: 2017–18

Celtic
 Scottish Premiership: 2021–22
 Scottish League Cup: 2021–22

Individual
 Eredivisie Player of the Month: January 2021
 Eredivisie Top Scorer: 2020–21
 Scottish Premiership Top Scorer: 2021–22 (shared)
 Scottish Premiership Player of the Month: March 2022
 Scottish Cup Top Scorer: 2021–22
Best Greek Player playing Abroad: 2020–21

References

External links

1994 births
Living people
Footballers from Heraklion
Greek footballers
Association football forwards
Platanias F.C. players
Episkopi F.C. players
AEK Athens F.C. players
OFI Crete F.C. players
Górnik Zabrze players
VVV-Venlo players
Celtic F.C. players
Atlanta United FC players
Super League Greece players
Football League (Greece) players
Ekstraklasa players
Eredivisie players
Scottish Professional Football League players
Greece under-21 international footballers
Greece international footballers
Greek expatriate footballers
Expatriate footballers in the Netherlands
Expatriate footballers in Poland
Expatriate footballers in Scotland
Greek expatriate sportspeople in the Netherlands
Greek expatriate sportspeople in Poland
Greek expatriate sportspeople in Scotland
Greek Romani people
Romani footballers
Scottish league football top scorers
Designated Players (MLS)